Pantsir-M is a Russian jamming-resistant naval close-in weapon system (CIWS) which entered service in 2018. Pantsir-M will replace Kashtan-M systems in Russian Navy.

According to Rostec CEO Sergey Chemezov, Pantsir-M's destructive power is three to four times higher than Kashtan-M's.

Description 
Pantsir-M is equipped with friend or foe identification system and armed with naval version of the Pantsir's 57E6 missiles and Hermes-K missiles. Its secondary armament are two six-barreled 30×165mm GSh-6-30K/AO-18KD rotary cannons (range 5 km), same as on Kashtan-M. Pantsir-M is fully automated and can engage up to four targets simultaneously at a range of up to 20 km and can operate as a battery of up to four modules. Pantsir-M can intercept sea skimming missiles flying as low as two meters above the surface. If a target isn't sufficiently destroyed by Pantsir's missile attack it can automatically direct its cannons against it. Pantsir-M's phased array radar, electro-optical/infrared targeting and identification system are based on that of Pantsir's 1RS2-1.

Parameters
Range: 20 km
Altitude: 15 km
Reaction time: 3–5 s
Rate of fire: 10,000 rounds per minute

Versions
There are two versions: 
Pantsir-M: The domestic version  
Pantsir-ME: The export version

Users

See also
Pantsir-S1
Meroka CIWS

References

Anti-aircraft weapons of Russia
30 mm artillery
Sea radars
Rotary cannon
Close-in weapon systems
Naval anti-aircraft guns

Surface-to-air missiles of Russia
KBP Instrument Design Bureau products
Military equipment introduced in the 2010s